Women In Astronomy Nepal (WIAN) was established on November 1, 2015 A.D. in order to provide a common platform for all the women interested in astronomy and in Nepal. It is a sub unit within Nepal Astronomical Society (NASO). WIAN is primarily concerned with young females pursuing their career in Science, Technology, Engineering and Mathematics (STEM).

Programs 

 Women in Outreach
 Women in Science Award (WiSA)
 Publication

References

External links 
Women in Astronomy Nepal's Facebook page

Scientific organisations based in Nepal
Women's organisations based in Nepal
2015 in space
Astronomy in Nepal
Science advocacy organizations
Astronomy societies
2015 establishments in Nepal